Anna Brzezińska (born 8 June 1971).

Biography 

Brzezińska was born in Opole and currently lives in Warsaw. She graduated in history at the Catholic University of Lublin and defended her PhD thesis in medieval history at the Central European University in Budapest. Her literary debut was her short story "A kochał ją, że strach", published in 1998 in the Magia i Miecz magazine, for which she received the Janusz A. Zajdel Award. Later she won the Zajdel Award also for the novel Żmijowa harfa and the short story Wody głębokie jak niebo.   Brzezińska is a co-owner of the RUNA publishing house. In the Internet she uses the nickname Sigrid.

Bibliography

Novels
Zbójecki Gościniec (Bandit's Highway) - NOWA (1999); revised version published as Plewy na wietrze (Chaff in the Wind) - RUNA (2006)
Żmijowa harfa (A Drake Harp) - NOWA (2000)
Letni deszcz. Kielich (Summer Rain. Cup) -  RUNA (2004)
Za króla, ojczyznę i garść złota (For the King, the Country and the Handful of Gold) - in collaboration with Grzegorz Wiśniewski, RUNA 2007
Na ziemi niczyjej (On No Man's Land) - in collaboration with Grzegorz Wiśniewski, RUNA 2008
Letni deszcz. Sztylet (Summer Rain. Dagger) - RUNA (2009)
 Córki Wawelu. Opowieść o jagiellońskich królewnach (Daughters of Wawel. The story of the Jagiellonian princesses), Cracow, Wydawnictwo Literackie, 2017.

Short story collections
Opowieści z Wilżyńskiej Doliny (Tales from the Wilzynska Valley) - RUNA (2002)
Wody głębokie jak niebo (Waters as Deep as the Sky) - RUNA (2005)
Wiedźma z Wilżyńskiej Doliny (The Witch of the Wilzynska Valley) - RUNA (2010)

References 

1971 births
Living people
People from Opole
Polish fantasy writers
Central European University alumni